René Sporleder (born 30 November 1969) is a German judoka.

Achievements

References
 

1969 births
Living people
German male judoka
Place of birth missing (living people)
20th-century German people